Malayevo (Malay) is a rural locality (a village) in Kamyshlinsky Selsoviet, Karmaskalinsky District, Bashkortostan, Russia. The population was 265 as of 2010. There are 4 streets.

Geography 
Malayevo is located 30 km southeast of Karmaskaly (the district's administrative centre) by road. Karakul is the nearest rural locality.

References 

Rural localities in Karmaskalinsky District